The 2nd European Rowing U23 Championships was the 2nd edition and was held from 1 to 2 September 2018 at the Brest Rowing Course in Brest, Belarus.

Medal summary

Men's events

Women's events

Medal table

See also
 2018 European Rowing Championships
 2018 European Rowing Junior Championships

References

External links
Official website
WorldRowing website

2018
2018 in Belarusian sport
International sports competitions hosted by Belarus
2018 in rowing
September 2018 sports events in Europe